Spain competed at the 1958 European Athletics Championships in Stockholm, Sweden, from 19–24 August 1954.

Results

Men
Track & road events

Field events

Nations at the 1958 European Athletics Championships
1958
European Athletics Championships